Brachmia juridica is a moth in the family Gelechiidae. It was described by Edward Meyrick in 1911. It is found in Sri Lanka.

The wingspan is 13–17 mm. The forewings are purplish grey, sprinkled with dark fuscous, more strongly in females. The stigmata is dark fuscous, the plical somewhat before the first discal. There is a spot of dark fuscous suffusion on the dorsum before the tornus. The hindwings are grey, darker in females.

References

Moths described in 1911
Brachmia
Taxa named by Edward Meyrick
Moths of Asia